"Feelin' So Good (S.K.O.O.B.Y.-D.O.O.)" is a song written by Jeff Barry and Andy Kim. It is the second single released by The Archies, a fictional bubblegum pop band from the Archie comics in late 1968 on Calendar Records.  The track was the first single released from their second studio album,  Everything's Archie.  The single peaked at number 53 on the Billboard Hot 100 chart. It was produced by Jeff Barry.

Charts

References

1968 singles
1968 songs
The Archies songs
Songs written by Jeff Barry
Songs written by Andy Kim